Brian Hetherston (23 November 1976 – 5 March 2006) was a Scottish professional footballer who played as a midfielder. His brother is Peter Hetherston.

Career
Born in Bellshill, Hetherston played in Scotland and Ireland for St Mirren, Sligo Rovers and Raith Rovers.

Later life and death
Hetherston retired from professional football after sustaining kidney and lung damage following an epileptic seizure; he died following another seizure on 5 March 2006.

References

1976 births
2006 deaths
Scottish footballers
St Mirren F.C. players
Sligo Rovers F.C. players
Raith Rovers F.C. players
Scottish Football League players
Association football midfielders
Scotland under-21 international footballers